The 2004 Oregon Democratic presidential primary was held on May 18 in the U.S. state of Oregon as one of the Democratic Party's statewide nomination contests ahead of the 2004 presidential election.

Results

References

Oregon
Democratic presidential primary
2004